Strange Friends is a 1982 Chinese film directed by Xu Lei. It was entered into the 33rd Berlin International Film Festival, where it won an Honourable Mention.

Cast
 Li Ling
 Wang Yunxia
 Zhang Chao
 Zhan Jingbo

References

External links

1982 films
Chinese drama films
1980s Mandarin-language films